Burcea is a Romanian surname. Notable people with the surname include:

Bogdan Burcea (born 1972), Romanian handball coach and sports lecturer
Florina-Cristina Burcea-Zamfir (born 1989), Romanian handball player, wife of Bogdan
Stelian Burcea (born 1983), Romanian rugby union player

Romanian-language surnames